Diamond Mine is an American professional wrestling stable formed in the professional wrestling promotion WWE on the NXT brand. Formed in June 2021, the group is led by Roderick Strong and includes Brutus Creed, Julius Creed, & Ivy Nile . The name and logo derives from the original formation of Malcolm Bivens and Tyler Rust, where Bivens gave him the nickname Diamond in the Rust followed by pounding their fists. Originally a multi-national stable, it also included the Billy Robinson trained Japanese professional and catch wrestler Hideki Suzuki, who was given the name Hachiman.

History 
After the collapse of The Undisputed Era in early February, Roderick Strong made his return on June 22 episode of NXT, attacking Kushida, as the Diamond Mine stable along with Tyler Rust (who was released weeks after and later replaced by The Creed Brothers and Ivy Nile) with Hachiman as the stable's trainer and Malcolm Bivens as their manager. On the September 21 episode of NXT 2.0, Strong defeated Kushida to win the NXT Cruiserweight Championship. At NXT WarGames, Strong defeated Joe Gacy, retaining his championship. On the NXT: New Year's Evil, he lost the title to Carmelo Hayes, unifying both North American and Cruiserweight titles. Strong and the rest of Diamond Mine would slowly turn face at the start of 2022, when they entered a feud with Imperium. On February 15, 2022, at NXT Vengeance Day, The Creed Brothers defeated MSK to win the Men's Dusty Rhodes Tag Team Classic. At Worlds Collide, Damon Kemp betrayed Diamond Mine by costing The Creed Brothers the NXT Tag Team Championship to Pretty Deadly in a fatal-four way elimination tag team title unification match, involving the NXT UK Tag Team Champions Josh Briggs and Brooks Jensen, and Gallus (Mark Coffey and Wolfgang), after hitting Julius Creed with a steel chair. On the March 14 episode of NXT, Tatum Paxley betrayed Ivy Nile, thus effectively leaving Diamond Mine.

Members 

The initial members of Diamond Mine consisted of Roderick Strong, Tyler Rust, and Hachiman, with Malcolm Bivens as manager. On August 6, Rust was released from WWE and summarily replaced by the Creed Brothers(Brutus & Julius Creed) and Ivy Nile. 

On January 5, Hachiman was released from WWE, ending his role as coach of the group.  On the February 17 edition of NXT, Bivens introduced Tatum Paxley as a new member of Diamond Mine, and she would become Nile's frequent tag team partner. On April 29, Bivens was also released from WWE. This meant Strong was the only founding member left in Diamond Mine. On May 10, Strong recruited Damon Kemp to join the faction, however, he left during the September 4 edition of NXT, when he attacked the Creed Brothers and cost them their tag team titles. On the March 14 episode of NXT, Paxley also left the faction after betraying Nile during a tag team match.

Current

Former

Timeline

Championships and accomplishments
 Pro Wrestling Illustrated
 Ranked Strong No. 269 of the top 500 singles wrestlers in the PWI 500 in 2021
 Ranked Tyler Rust No. 192 of the top 500 singles wrestlers in the PWI 500 in 2021
WWE
NXT Cruiserweight Championship (1 time) – Strong
NXT Tag Team Championship (1 time) – Creed Brothers
Men's Dusty Rhodes Tag Team Classic (2022) – Creed Brothers

References 

2021 establishments in the United States
WWE teams and stables
WWE NXT teams and stables